Sharrod Neasman (born October 14, 1991) is an American football free safety who is a free agent. He played college football at Florida Atlantic and was signed by the Atlanta Falcons as an undrafted free agent in 2016.

Professional career

Atlanta Falcons
On May 5, 2016, Neasman signed with the Atlanta Falcons as an undrafted free agent. He was released by the Falcons on September 3, 2016 and was signed to the practice squad the next day. He was promoted to the active roster on October 18, 2016.

In the 2016 season, Neasman and the Falcons reached Super Bowl LI, where they faced the New England Patriots on February 5, 2017. In the Super Bowl, the Falcons fell in a 34–28 overtime defeat.

In 2017, Neasman played in 11 games, recording two tackles. He was not tendered a contract following the 2017 season.

New Orleans Saints
On May 31, 2018, Neasman signed with the New Orleans Saints. He was waived on September 1, 2018.

Atlanta Falcons (second stint)
On September 25, 2018, Neasman was signed by the Falcons. He played in 12 games, recording 44 tackles and four passes defensed.

Neasman re-signed with the Falcons on March 20, 2020.

In Week 15 against the Tampa Bay Buccaneers, Neasman recorded his first career sack on Tom Brady during the 31–27 loss.

New York Jets
On June 10, 2021, Neasman signed with the New York Jets. He was placed on injured reserve on September 11, 2021. He was activated on October 2. He was released on January 8, 2022 before the season finale.

Los Angeles Rams
On January 12, 2022, Neasman was signed to the Los Angeles Rams practice squad. Neasman won Super Bowl LVI when the Rams defeated the Cincinnati Bengals.

References

External links
Florida Atlantic Owls bio

1991 births
Living people
21st-century African-American sportspeople
African-American players of American football
Players of American football from Florida
Sportspeople from Sarasota, Florida
American football safeties
Florida Atlantic Owls football players
Atlanta Falcons players
New Orleans Saints players
New York Jets players
Los Angeles Rams players